Ardeer railway station is located on the Serviceton line in Victoria, Australia. It serves the western Melbourne suburb of Ardeer, and it opened on 2 May 1977.

History

1903-1956
In 1903, the Australian Explosives and Chemical Company Siding was provided on the north side of the line, near what would become the site of Ardeer station. In 1910, a connection to the siding was added at the Melbourne (up) end, converting it into a loop, and it was renamed the Federal Manure Siding. In 1929, it was renamed again as Nobel (Australasia) Pty Ltd Chemical Siding.

On 2 April 1929, the station opened, coinciding with the introduction of a passenger service for factory workers at Ardeer and Deer Park. The loop siding was to the east of the former Fitzgerald Road level crossing, and the platform was to the west of it, on the north side of the line. In 1934, it was renamed Ardeer Siding. On 28 August 1956, the station was closed and the passenger platform removed.

1976-present
In 1976, the line through the section of the former station was duplicated from Sunshine to Deer Park West Junction. On 2 May 1977, the current Ardeer station opened, with an island platform being provided at the up end of the existing siding, about 800 metres further east than the former station. In 1981, the Nobel (Australasia) Pty Ltd Siding was renamed ICI Australia Operations Pty Ltd Siding and, in 1990, was abolished.

As part of the Regional Rail Link project, the station underwent a minor platform upgrade. Noise walls were also installed along the corridor, and safety gates were provided at nearby pedestrian crossings.

First announced by the Andrews State Government in 2018, the station is set to be integrated into the metropolitan railway network, as part of the Western Rail Plan.

Platforms and services

Ardeer has one island platform with two faces. It is served by V/Line Ballarat and Ararat line trains.

Platform 1:
  V/Line services to Southern Cross
  services to Southern Cross

Platform 2:
  V/Line services to Melton, Bacchus Marsh and Wendouree
  services to Ararat

Transport links

CDC Melbourne operates one bus route via Ardeer station, under contract to Public Transport Victoria:
 : Sunshine station – Laverton station (shared with Transit Systems Victoria)

Transit Systems Victoria operates three bus routes via Ardeer station, under contract to Public Transport Victoria:
 : Sunshine station – Laverton station (shared with CDC Melbourne)
 : Sunshine station – Brimbank Central Shopping Centre
 : Sunshine station – Sunshine West

Gallery

References

External links
 
 Victorian Railway Stations gallery
 Melway map at street-directory.com.au

Railway stations in Melbourne
Railway stations in Australia opened in 1927
Railway stations in the City of Brimbank